Yevhen Anatoliyovych Novak (born 1 February 1989) is a Ukrainian professional footballer who plays as a centre-back for Ukrainian club Kolos Kovalivka.

Club career

Dynamo Kyiv
Novak is a product of Dynamo Kyiv, he made his debut with Dynamo-3 Kyiv on 28 April 2007 in a 0–0 home draw against Knyazha Shchaslyve and after more than a year, Novak made his debut with Dynamo-2 Kyiv on 10 August 2008 in a 2–2 away draw against Knyazha Shchaslyve.

Sevastopol
On 24 June 2012, Novak joined Ukrainian First League side Sevastopol. On 14 July 2012, he made his debut in a 2–2 home draw against Naftovyk-Ukrnafta Okhtyrka after being named in the starting line-up.

Volyn Lutsk
On 5 July 2014, Novak joined Ukrainian Premier League side Volyn Lutsk. On 11 August 2014, he made his debut in a 0–1 away defeat against Chornomorets Odesa after coming on as a substitute at 45th minute in place of Roman Hodovanyi.

Vardar
On 1 September 2015, Novak joined Macedonian First Football League side Vardar after agreeing to a one-year deal with the option of continuation for two years. On 13 September 2015, he made his debut in a 5–1 home win against Horizont Turnovo after coming on as a substitute at 82nd minute in place of Nikola Gligorov.

International career

Ukraine

Under-21
On 28 March 2009, Novak made his debut with Ukraine U21 in a friendly match against Serbia U21 after coming on as a substitute at last minutes in place of Roman Zozulya, he was planned to be called up again from Ukraine U21 in February 2011 for friendly match against Switzerland U21, but due to injury, could not be part of the national team.

North Macedonia
Večer announced that Novak from 1 September 2020 will officially fulfill the main condition for receive the North Macedonia passport and will be available of North Macedonia national team for UEFA Euro 2020 qualifying play-offs that to be scheduled to take place in October and November 2020.

Personal life
In March 2014, Novak received a call-up from Armed Forces of Ukraine, but stated that he was not going to join the army.

References

External links
 
 

1989 births
Living people
People from Cherkasy Oblast
Ukrainian footballers
Ukrainian expatriate footballers
Ukraine under-21 international footballers
Ukrainian expatriate sportspeople in North Macedonia
Association football central defenders
FC Dynamo-3 Kyiv players
FC Dynamo-2 Kyiv players
FC Sevastopol players
Ukrainian Premier League players
Ukrainian First League players
Ukrainian Second League players
FC Volyn Lutsk players
FC Kolos Kovalivka players
Expatriate footballers in North Macedonia
Macedonian First Football League players
FK Vardar players
Sportspeople from Cherkasy Oblast